The Agricultural Land Classification system forms part of the planning system in England and Wales. It classifies agricultural land in five categories according to versatility and suitability for growing crops.

Grades
Grade 1, 2 and 3a, are referred to as 'Best and Most Versatile' land, and enjoy significant protection from development.
Grade 4 and 5 are described as poor quality agricultural land and very poor quality agricultural land

Wales

In November 2017, the Welsh Government launched the Predictive Agricultural Land Classification Map.

This is the first update since the 1970s and replaces the Provisional Agricultual Land Classiciation Map for Wales. Importantly it distinguishes between ALC Sub-grades 3a and 3b.

The Welsh Government is undertaking the first update to the Predictive Agricultural Land Classification Map between 2018 and 2020.

Frequently Asked Questions describes how the quality of farm land is graded and what this grade means for landowners.

References

External links
 Regional Agricultural Land Classification Maps – Natural England
 Natural England technical note on the ALC system
 Dataset Information: Agricultural Land Classification - Provisional (England)
 Ministry of Agriculture, Fisheries and Food Agricultural Land Classification of England and Wales

Agriculture in the United Kingdom
Town and country planning in the United Kingdom